Domenico Maria Marchese, O.P. (1633–1692) was a Roman Catholic prelate who served as Bishop of Pozzuoli (1688–1692).

Biography
Domenico Maria Marchese was born on 2 Mar 1633 in Naples, Italy and ordained a priest in the Order of Preachers.

On 31 May 1688, he was appointed Bishop of Pozzuoli by Pope Innocent XI.
On 31 May 1688, he was consecrated bishop by Galeazzo Marescotti, Cardinal-Priest of Santi Quirico e Giulitta, with Pietro de Torres, Archbishop of Dubrovnik, and Pier Antonio Capobianco, Bishop Emeritus of Lacedonia, serving as co-consecrators.

He served as Bishop of Pozzuoli until his death in May 1692.

References

External links and additional sources
 (for Chronology of Bishops) 
 (for Chronology of Bishops)  

17th-century Italian Roman Catholic bishops
Bishops appointed by Pope Innocent XI
1633 births
1692 deaths
Dominican bishops
17th-century Neapolitan people